Nintendomagasinet (NM) was a Swedish video game magazine, published between the years of 1990 and 1994. The magazine contained game news, reports from fairs and expos, game guides, editorials, video game-related comics, and the subscriber-only "Power Player" supplement containing game reviews. The comics were translations of the Nintendo Comics System comics, and later the Nintendo Power comics Super Mario Adventures and The Legend of Zelda.

References

1990 comics debuts
1994 comics endings
1990 establishments in Sweden
1994 disestablishments in Sweden
Comics magazines published in Sweden
Defunct magazines published in Sweden
Magazines about comics
Magazines about Nintendo
Magazines established in 1990
Magazines disestablished in 1994
Magazines published in Stockholm
Swedish-language magazines
Ten times annually magazines
Video game magazines published in Sweden